Zakazane piosenki (Forbidden Songs) is a 1946 Polish musical film directed by Leonard Buczkowski. It was the first feature film to be created in Poland following the six years of World War II.

The film, set during the German occupation of Warsaw during the war, tells the story of several inhabitants of the same tenement house. Their stories are loosely tied together by a set of songs, both pre-war ballads popular during the war and war-time popular songs mocking German occupation (Siekiera, motyka).

The film's premiere took place on 8 January 1947 in the newly reopened Palladium cinema in Warsaw. The film proved to be highly popular and more than 10.8 million people watched it in the following three years – twice the usual average attendance in post-war Poland.

In 1948 the film was re-edited and re-released in a new version, with more focus on Red Army's role as the liberator of Poland and the main ally of post-war Polish communist regime, as well as more grim outlook of the German occupation of Warsaw and German brutality in general. Main differences:
 place of Roman Tokarski's (main character) narration:
 1947 edition—a film studio,
 1948 edition—a flat. A former soldier of Polish Armed Forces in the West often blunders when Tokarski tells about German occupation.
 boy singing song against Germans in tram—song ends with words Śpiewać się nie boję, bo mnie nie zrozumią te przeklęte gnoje. (Polish I'm not afraid to sing, because those damn bastards won't understand me):
 1947 edition—boy escapes. When a German officer is shouting Ja rozumie! Ja rozumie! Gnoje to my, Deutsche! (broken Polish I understand! I understand! Bastards are we, Deutsche!), all passengers laugh,
 1948 edition—German officer shouts Halt! Boy tries to escape, but he is shot by German soldiers.
 German policeman at Tokarski's home:
 1947 edition—policeman begins to play piano,
 1948 edition—policeman tries to force Tokarski's mother to play the Deutschlandlied, beats and pushes her.
 soldiers of Polish resistance at home of Volksdeutsche Maria Kędziorek (Marie Kentschorek):
 1947 edition—they shot her,
 1948 edition—movie suggests that they have shaved her head.
 a scene in which a blind accordionist is killed by Polish policeman, was added in 1948 edition.
However, as the farcical plot and all-familiar songs were mostly free of ideological subtexts, the film remained popular in the decades to come and some of its songs re-emerged in slightly modified form during the 1980s martial law and struggle against the Communist rule. The film remains well-known and popular even in modern Poland, being screened by the public Polish Television (TVP) on a regular basis. Both editions have been published on DVD in Poland, by the Propaganda label, first the 1947 one, as-is, and later the 1948 one, in a digitally restored version.

Cast 

 Danuta Szaflarska as Halina Tokarska
 Jerzy Duszyński as Roman Tokarski
 Jan Świderski as Ryszard
 Janina Ordężanka 
 Jan Kurnakowicz as Cieślak
 Stanisław Łapiński 
 Zofia Jamry as Maria Kędziorek
 Konstanty Pągowski 
 Józef Maliszewski 
 Hanna Bielicka 
 Alina Janowska 
 Zofia Mrozowska 
 Leon Pietraszkiewicz 
 Czesław Piaskowski 
 Stanisława Piasecka 
 Bronisław Darski 
 Helena Puchniewska 
 Ludwik Tatarski 
 Kazimierz Wichniarz 
 Jarosław Skulski 
 Edward Dziewoński 
 Henryk Szweizer 
 Feliks Żukowski as Jurek
 Henryk Modrzewski 
 Henryk Borowski 
 Stefan Śródka 
 Igor Śmiałowski 
 Zdzisław Lubelski 
 Artur Młodnicki 
 Adam Mikołajewski 
 Maria Bielicka 
 Bolesław Bolkowski 
 Janina Draczewska 
 Andrzej Łapicki 
 Wanda Jakubińska 
 Kazimierz Dejunowicz 
 Marian Dąbrowski 
 Witold Sadowy

References 

1946 films
Polish war films
1940s Polish-language films
Polish musical films
1946 musical films
1940s war films
Polish black-and-white films
Polish World War II films
Films about Polish resistance during World War II